The 1986 La Flèche Wallonne was the 50th edition of La Flèche Wallonne cycle race and was held on 16 April 1986. The race started in Spa and finished in Huy. The race was won by Laurent Fignon of the Système U team.

General classification

Notes

References

1986 in road cycling
1986
1986 in Belgian sport
1986 Super Prestige Pernod International